More is an American brand of cigarettes, currently owned and manufactured by the R.J. Reynolds Tobacco Company in the United States, Japan Tobacco in the European Union and PMFTC in the Philippines.

History
Initially tested in Oklahoma City in 1974, the brand was introduced nationally by the R.J. Reynolds Tobacco Company in June 1975. More was originally marketed to both men and women and then changed its primary focus to female consumers. It typically has a dark brown (rather than the traditional white) wrapper and is typically 120 mm in length. The More brand does, however, produce shorter versions with the typical white wrapper and white or cork filters.

Bridging the gap between cigars and cigarettes, More was the first successful 120 mm cigarette. It had a strong flavor and when introduced was higher in tar and nicotine than most filter cigarettes on the market. It is sold in both the full flavor and menthol flavors. It is currently considered a niche brand by R.J. Reynolds, still sold, but not promoted by advertising. 

It is sold globally under license to various other tobacco companies under the title of More International. The brand was expanded to include 'light' styles in the form of both brown and white 120 mm and a beige 100 mm.

The brand appeared recently in the 2021 movie Swan Song.

Advertising
R.J. Reynolds made various poster adverts to promote the More brand in the 1980s and 1990s, and posters for More International were also made by Japan Tobacco outside the U.S.

In the Philippines, a TV ad was made in the 1990s to promote the More brand. A radio advert was also made in 2002.

Markets
More cigarettes are mainly sold in the United States, but also were or still are sold in the British Virgin Islands, Argentina, United Kingdom, the Netherlands, Austria, Spain, Italy, the Czech Republic, Romania, Bulgaria, Greece, Latvia, Lithuania, Belarus, Ukraine, Russia, Azerbaijan, Israel, Thailand, Malaysia, Hong Kong and Taiwan.

United States Varieties
 More Slim 120s (Full Flavor)
 More Menthol Slim 120s (Full Flavor)
 More Gold Slim 120s (Lights)
 More Silver Menthol Slim 120s (Lights)

See also
 Tobacco smoking

References

R. J. Reynolds Tobacco Company brands
Japan Tobacco brands
Tobacco in the Philippines